The Bank One Classic was a golf tournament on the Champions Tour from 1983 to 1997. It was played in Lexington, Kentucky at the Griffin Gate Golf Club (1983-1989) and at the Kearney Hill Links (1990-1997).

The purse for the 1997 tournament was US$800,000, with $120,000 going to the winner. The tournament was founded in 1983 as the Citizens Union Senior Golf Classic.

Winners
Bank One Classic
1997 Vicente Fernández
1996 Mike Hill
1995 Gary Player

Bank One Senior Classic
1994 Isao Aoki
1993 Gary Player
1992 Terry Dill
1991 DeWitt Weaver

Vantage Bank One Classic
1990 Rives McBee

RJR Bank One Classic
1989 Rives McBee

Vantage presents Bank One Senior Golf Classic
1988 Bob Charles
1987 Bruce Crampton

Bank One Senior Golf Classic
1986 Gene Littler

Citizens Union Senior Golf Classic
1985 Lee Elder
1984 Gay Brewer
1983 Don January

Source:

References

Former PGA Tour Champions events
Golf in Kentucky
Sports in Lexington, Kentucky
Recurring sporting events established in 1983
Recurring sporting events disestablished in 1997
1983 establishments in Kentucky
1997 disestablishments in Kentucky